DreamLab is a volunteer computing Android and iOS app launched in 2015 by Imperial College London and the Vodafone Foundation.

Description 
The app currently helps to research cancer, COVID-19, new drugs and tropical cyclones. To do this, DreamLab accesses part of the device's processing power, with the user's consent, while the owner is charging their smartphone, to speed up the calculations of the algorithms from Imperial College London.

The aim of the tropical cyclone project is to prepare for climate change risks. Other projects aim to find existing drugs and food molecules that could help people with COVID-19 and other diseases. The performance of 100,000 smartphones would reach the annual output of all research computers at Imperial College in just three months with a nightly runtime of six hours.

The app was developed in 2015 by the Garvan Institute of Medical Research in Sydney and the Vodafone Foundation.

See also
 Volunteer computing
 Folding@home
 BOINC

References

External links 
 DreamLab App at Google Playstore
 DreamLab App at Apple Appstore
Network machine learning maps phytochemically rich “Hyperfoods” to fight COVID-19

Volunteer computing projects
Application software
Medical research
Medical research organizations
Protein structure
Bioinformatics software